The women's 200 metre backstroke competition at the 2018 Mediterranean Games was held on 25 June 2018 at the Campclar Aquatic Center.

Records 
Prior to this competition, the existing world and Mediterranean Games records were as follows:

Results 
The final was held at 18:17.

References 

Women's 200 metre backstroke
2018 in women's swimming